Becher is a surname. Notable people with the surname include:

 Henry Becher, (fl. 1561), English translator and vicar of Mayfield
 Michael Becher, (1704–1758), Bristol-born English slave trader and merchant

 Andrew Cracroft Becher, CBE (1858–1929), British Army major-general 
 Balthasar Bekker, Dutch minister and author of philosophical and theological works
 Bernd and Hilla Becher, German photographers
 Eduard Becher (1856–1886), Austrian entomologist 
 Giora Becher, Israel’s Ambassador to Brazil from 2008 until 2011
 Hans-Jürgen Becher (born 1941), German footballer
 Heinz Manfred Becher (born 1933), West German rower 
 Henry Corry Rowley Becher (1817–1895), Canadian lawyer, politician and author
 Johann Joachim Becher (1635–1682), German physician and alchemist
 John Augustus Becher, (1833–1915), American businessman and politician
 Johannes R. Becher, (1891–1958), German politician and writer
 John Thomas Becher, English clergyman and writer on social economy
 Kurt Becher, (1909–1995), German SS officer
 Mordechai Becher, author and lecturer on Jewish theology
 Rev. John Thomas Becher, (1770–1848), English clergyman, social reformer and Vicar-General of Southwell Minster
 Ricardo Becher, (1930–2011), Argentine film director, screenwriter and journalist
 Siegfried Becher, (1806–1873), Austrian political economist
 Ulrich Becher, German writer
 Verónica Becher, Argentinian computer scientist
 Walter Becher (1912–2005), German Bohemian politician, representative of the All-German Bloc/League of Expellees and Deprived of Rights (GB/BHE)

See also
  Becher (biblical figure), the name of two historic personalities of the Old Testament
 Becher Peninsula, Nunavut, Canada
 Becher Point Wetlands, Western Australia
 Becher process, a process used to convert ilmenite to synthetic rutile
 Port Kennedy, Western Australia, formerly known as Becher
 Becher's Brook, celebrated fence at Aintree Racecourse
 Becher process, an industrial process used to produce rutile, a form of titanium dioxide, from the ore ilmenite
 Jan Becher, Czech company
 Becher (biblical figure)
 Wrixon-Becher baronets, a title in the Baronetage of the United Kingdom
 Becker (disambiguation)

Jewish surnames